Nipe-Sagua-Baracoa, also known as Macizo Nipe Sagua Baracoa ("Nipe Sagua Baracoa Massif"), is a mountain range of eastern Cuba.

Geography
The range is located in Holguín Province and Guantánamo Province, and slightly into Santiago de Cuba Province.

Extended for a length of 187 km and a width of 50, the Nipe-Sagua-Baracoa spans from the central-eastern part of the Province of Holguín (near Nipe Bay, Mayarí) to the eastern corner of the one of Guantánamo, up to Maisí. It borders with the mountain range of Sierra Maestra and counts the Pico Cristal that, with an elevation of 1,231 m, is the second Cuban peak after the Pico Turquino (1,974 m).

The range is crossed by the rivers Toa, Mayarí and Sagua de Tánamo.

Composition
The range is composed by several subgroups:
Sierra del Nipe, with the highest peak at the Loma de la Mensura (994 m)
Sierra Cristal, with the highest peak at the Pico Cristal (1,231 m)
Cuchillas de Moa, surrounding the homonym city, with the highest peak at the Pico del Toldo (1,175 m)
Cuchillas de Baracoa, near the homonym city, with a maximum elevation of 788 m
Cuchillas del Toa, with the highest peak at the Pico Galán (974 m)
Sierra del Purial, with a maximum elevation of 1,059 m
Sierra de Imías, near the homonym town, with the highest peak at the Pico el Gato (1,176 m)

Environment
Nipe-Sagua-Baracoa is known for its biodiversity and counts the national parks of Sierra Cristal and Alejandro de Humboldt, and the biosphere reserve of Cuchillas del Toa.

See also
El Yunque
Sagua de Tánamo
Geography of Cuba

References

External links

Mountain ranges of Cuba
Geography of Holguín Province
Geography of Guantánamo Province
Geography of Santiago de Cuba Province
Mayarí